Eduardo Angulo (born 2 March 1953) is a Bolivian footballer. He played in eight matches for the Bolivia national football team from 1975 to 1979. He was also part of Bolivia's squad for the 1975 Copa América tournament.

References

External links
 

1953 births
Living people
Bolivian footballers
Bolivia international footballers
Place of birth missing (living people)
Association football defenders
The Strongest players
Club Bolívar players